Augustus Busck (February 18, 1870 – March 7, 1944) was a Danish-American entomologist with the United States Department of Agriculture's Bureau of Entomology. He is best known for his work with microlepidoptera, of which he described over 600 species. His collections of Lepidoptera from North America and the Panama Canal Zone are held by the National Museum of Natural History in Washington, D.C.

Publications 
Busck authored and co-authored over 150 papers, among them:

 1902: A list of the North American Lepidoptera and key to the literature of this order of insects. Harrison Gray Dyar Jr.; assisted by Charles H. Fernald, Ph.D., the late Rev. George Duryea Hulst, and August Busck. Bulletin of the United States National Museum: 52.
 1911: Descriptions of tineoid moths (Microlepidoptera) from South America. Proceedings of the United States National Museum, Volume 40, Issue: 1815:205–230.
 1915: with Lord Walsingham, Volume IV (1909–1915) of Biologia Centrali-Americana.

Notes

References
Gaedike, R. & Groll, E.K. eds. 2001. Entomologen der Welt (Biografien, Sammlungsverbleib). Datenbank, DEI Eberswalde im ZALF e.V.: August Busck   online database – includes further references and portrait.
Gates Clarke, J.F. 1974. Busck, A. Journal of the Lepidopterists' Society, New Haven 28:183, 185–186 (portrait).
Mallis, Arnold (1971). American Entomologists. Rutgers University Press. pp. 326–327.
Osborn, H. 1952. A Brief History of Entomology Including Time of Demosthenes and Aristotle to Modern Times with over Five Hundred Portraits. Columbus, Ohio, The Spahr & Glenn Company.

External links 
 
 

1870 births
1944 deaths
American lepidopterists
Danish emigrants to the United States
Danish lepidopterists